Din Dunia, a historical Urdu magazine published from New Delhi. Established in 1921, Din Dunia originally covered politics, films, and society gossip. Today, it is a monthly journal that covers Islamic matters.
Mufti Shaukat Ali, who had founded it in 1921 as a weekly tabloid on society, politics, and films. The publication was temporarily suspended during the years following the Partition, after which the magazine was restarted with a single-minded focus on Islam. Owing to his father's ill health, Asif Fehmi took over Din Dunia in 1987.

At the moment, Din Dunia is published monthly.

References

Magazines established in 1921
Urdu-language magazines
Monthly magazines published in India
Islamic magazines
1921 establishments in India